Kertu Ly Alnek (born 14 September 1999) is an Estonian butterfly and freestyle swimmer.

She is 6-time long course and 9-time short course Estonian swimming champion. She has broken 4 Estonian records in swimming.

References

1999 births
Living people
Estonian female butterfly swimmers
Estonian female freestyle swimmers
Sportspeople from Tartu
European Games competitors for Estonia
Swimmers at the 2015 European Games
21st-century Estonian women